Speaking of Sex is a 2001 Canadian/American/French comedy film directed by John McNaughton and starring Bill Murray, James Spader, Lara Flynn Boyle, and Jay Mohr.

Premise
When a couple having marital problems see a female marriage counselor who advertises on a bus bench, she recommends that the wife see a male depression expert, who ends up initiating an affair with the wife.

Cast
 Bill Murray as Ezri Stovall
 James Spader as Dr. Roger Klink
 Lara Flynn Boyle as Dr. Emily Page
 Jay Mohr as Dan
 Melora Walters as Melinda
 Phil LaMarr as Joel Johnson, Jr.
 Megan Mullally as Jennifer Klink
 Nathaniel Arcand as Calvin
 Nick Offerman as Sheriff Panghorn
 Catherine O'Hara as Connie Barker

Production
The movie was filmed in Calgary, Alberta, Canada.

References

External links

2001 films
American romantic comedy films
Canadian romantic comedy films
French romantic comedy films
English-language Canadian films
English-language French films
2001 romantic comedy films
Films directed by John McNaughton
Films scored by George S. Clinton
2000s English-language films
2000s American films
2000s Canadian films
2000s French films